Standing in the Light may refer to:
Standing in the Light: The Captive Diary of Catherine Carey Logan, a novel by Mary Pope Osborne
Standing in the Light, an album and its title track by Level 42
"Standing in the Light", a song by Gotthard from their self-titled debut album